The 2013 European Junior Badminton Championships were held at the ASKI Sport Hall in Ankara, Turkey, between 22-31 March 2013.

Venue 
This Tournament was held at the ASKI Sport Hall in İvedik, Ankara, Turkey.

Medalists

Medal table

References

External links
 Individual Result
 Team Result

European Junior Badminton Championships
European Junior Badminton Championships
European Junior Badminton Championships
European Junior Badminton Championships
2013
International sports competitions hosted by Turkey
Youth sport in Turkey